Armiamoci e partite! (Italian for "Let US arm ourselves and YOU go!") is a 1971 war comedy film directed by Nando Cicero and starring the comic duo Franco and Ciccio.

Plot

Cast 

 Franco Franchi as Franco
 Ciccio Ingrassia as Ciccio
 Martine Brochard as Lilì
 Philippe Clay as General McMaster
  as  Cpt. Dubois
 Anna Maestri 
 Renato Baldini as Major Rembaud
  Gino Pagnani as French Captain 
  Renato Pinciroli as French General 
  as Cafè Owner
 Alberto Sorrentino as Train Passenger  
 Nino Terzo as Train Passenger 
 Aldo Bufi Landi  
 Luigi Bonos as Baron's Assistant
  Aldo Barberito as Lt. Duval 
 Ignazio Leone as Doctor 
 Corrado Olmi

References

External links

Films directed by Nando Cicero
Films scored by Piero Umiliani
Italian World War I films
Italian buddy comedy films
1970s buddy comedy films
1970s Italian-language films
1971 films
1970s Italian films